Thompson's Island is a  alluvial island in the upper Allegheny River.  It is located in Pleasant Township, Warren County, Pennsylvania, and is part of the Allegheny Islands Wilderness in Allegheny National Forest.

The island's forests contain old growth Silver Maple, Sugar Maple, American Sycamore, and Slippery Elm.

Thompson's Island is the site of the only American Revolutionary War battle in Northwest Pennsylvania.  Colonel Daniel Brodhead defeated the Senecas in 1779.

See also
List of old growth forests
Possession Island (Namibia)

References
Nature Tourism
Forest County

Allegheny Islands Wilderness
American Revolutionary War sites
Old-growth forests
Protected areas of Warren County, Pennsylvania
Landforms of Warren County, Pennsylvania
River islands of Pennsylvania
Islands of the Allegheny River in Pennsylvania